Estadio Mariscal Nieto is a multi-use stadium in Ilo, Peru. It is currently used mostly for football matches and is the home stadium of Deportivo Enersur and Mariscal Nieto of the Copa Perú. The stadium holds 3,000 spectators.

Mariscal Nieto
Buildings and structures in Moquegua Region